The Genius: Grand Final is the fourth season of The Genius. It debuted on tvN on June 27, 2015.

Cast
(in alphabetical order)

Choi Jung-moon S1 
Choi Yeon-seung    S3
Hong Jin-ho    S1 & S2
Jang Dong-min  S3
Kim Kyung-hoon S3
Kim Kyung-ran  S1
Kim Yoo-hyun       S3
Lee Jun-seok   S1
Lee Sang-min S1 & S2
Lim Yo-hwan    S2
Lim Yoon-sun       S2
Oh Hyun-min    S3
Yoo Jung-hyun      S2

Format Change

Garnet Match

With a similar gameplay with Main Matches, after every Garnet Match, the player(s) with the highest number of garnets will win the match and the player(s) with the lowest number of garnets will be the elimination candidate. If there is more than one player that has the fewest garnets, the winner(s) will select the elimination candidate before the elimination candidate picks his/her opponent. Garnets cannot be transferred between players during Garnet Matches.

The Main Matches for Episodes 2, 6 and 10 were Garnet Matches.

Death Match

Death matches in this season have been predetermined and are all games from past seasons. For every death match, both of the death match players are allowed to opt out a few games before one is randomly chosen out by the dealer. Players were allowed to choose 3 games in Episodes 1 and 2, 2 games in Episodes 3, 4 and 5 and 1 game in Episodes 6, 7 and 8. No more death matches can be opted out starting from Episode 9.

The following death matches as pre-determined for Season 4:

Black and White (played in episode 1)
Tactical Yutnori (played in episode 2)
Betting! Rock, Paper, Scissors (played in episode 3)
Same Number Hunt (played in episode 4)
Indian Poker (played in episode 5)
Monorail (played in episode 6)
Same Picture Hunt (played in episode 7)
Gyul! Hap! (played in episode 8)
Quattro (played in episode 9)
Double Sided Poker (played in episode 10)
Twelve Janggi (played in episode 11)

Episodes

Footnotes

 1 Garnet were allowed to be transferred between players for Rounds 3 and 7 for the game.

 Garnet Matches

 This game was not played during the death match, as Jang Dongmin has already won the 2 other games, namely Number Janggi and Mystery Sign. This meant that he has already won.

Elimination Chart 

The finalist which the returning eliminated players chose to give the items.

Main Matches

Episode 1: ID Exchange (13 contestants) 
Each player is assigned an ID card. These cards can be officially and unofficially traded, and the player with the most points at the end of the game will win. Out of all 13 ID cards, there are 7 Commoner cards, 5 Noble cards, and 1 Convict card. All ID cards have the same appearance, and their identities can only be seen under a black light after an official trade takes place. Before the game, each player randomly draws their ID card and use the black light to see what they're assigned. During the game, players will execute official and unofficial trades with each other in order to gain points and avoid becoming the elimination candidate. Official trades are the only way to earn points and discover the identity of the card received, but they are limited. You may only officially trade with each player once. Unofficial trades are done without the permission of the dealers and can be done any number of times, but no points will be gained, and the black light will not be available to uncover an ID card's identity. To make an official trade, both players must approach the dealer's trading table and present an ID card. The cards will be swapped, and you will gain points depending on the identity of the card you traded away, and then the identity of the new card is revealed to both players. How to gain points? Noble and Convict card holders gain points by trading with a Commoner. Nobles gain 1 point by trading with a commoner. Convicts gain 2 points by trading with a commoner. However, the player with the convict card at the end of the game will be the elimination candidate. And the last player to officially trade away the convict card, regardless of the card they receive, will gain a bonus 3 points. The players must avoid being stuck with the convict card and figure out a way to gain the most points. Every 3 points will earn a player 1 garnet.

Episode 2: Horror Race (12 contestants) 
This game is a garnet match.

In Horror Race you will make the characters you support win a race to obtain garnets. The characters are vampire, jiangshi (zombie), gumiho (nine-tailed fox), mummy, and zombie. These characters will race on a track with 12 spaces. Before the race, all 12 contestants choose 2 of these characters to support. However, the 3 characters not chosen will be put into the coin box. The characters chosen by the contestants will not be revealed. The characters coins added to the coin box will be used to move through the race. Contestants will draw 3 coins from the coin box, and place them in any combination of the 1, 2, or 4 movement squares. After every player has drawn 3 coins, the character with the most coins on a movement square will move that many spaces along the track. If more than one character has the highest coin total, the character with the next highest coin total will move. Once the last player places their coins, the round is over, and the characters are moved in the 1 box, then the 2 box, and finally the 4 box. Then the coins are replaced into the coin box and a new round begins. The order the players draw the coins in will be randomly determined at the start of the game, however, they will be able to influence this order. During a player's turn, they may surrender their coins and be able to draw last in the next round. Only one player may surrender their coins each round. Once a player surrenders their coins, the next player after them becomes the 1st player in the next round, and the player after them the 2nd, and so on. The rounds will continue until one character passes the finish line. The characters closest to the finish line at the end will be 2nd, and the next in line will be 3rd. Supporting the 1st place finisher earns 3 garnets, 2nd place earns 2 garnets, and 3rd place earns 1 garnet. In the best possible outcome, the characters a player supports earning 1st and 2nd place, that player will earn 5 total garnets. The player with the most garnets after the end of the game will be the winner, and the player with the least will be the elimination candidate.

Although drawing from the coin box appears random, the vampire and mummy coins were made with steel cores, which are magnetic, while the others are made with brass cores, which are not magnetic. The players could have used the magnets on their name tags to tell the difference and obtain an advantage in the coin drawing process, but Jang Dong-Min managed to sense the slight weight difference between the steel and brass cores of the coin and tell them apart by feel alone, a feat the producers thought impossible, as the steel core coins were only 102 milligrams heavier than the brass core coins.

Episode 3: Today's Menu (11 contestants) 
In Today's Menu, every player will order a meal, and then attempt to determine how many other players ordered the same meal to earn points. Every player has the option between jajangmyeon (noodles in a black bean sauce), jjamppong (spicy seafood noodle soup), and fried rice. The players have a card representing each item. When a round begins, every player will have 20 minutes to place their cards in their card box, with the dish they wish to order on top. These boxes are then unable to be opened. The players will then guess how many total orders were received of the dish they chose. They have the option between 1 order (worth 5 points), 2-3 orders (worth 3 points), 4-6 orders (worth 2 points), 7-10 orders (worth 1 point), and 11 orders (worth 4 points). Once every player has placed their box in the square representing their guess, everyone will have 1 minute to move their box and change their guess. After 1 minute, no one is able to change their guess anymore. The orders are revealed and everyone that guessed correctly will earn the appropriate amount of points, players that guessed incorrectly earn nothing. For every 4 points a player receives, they will also receive 1 garnet. 4 rounds will be played in this manner, and the player with the highest point total wins, and the player with the lowest will be the elimination candidate.

The box is not as simple as it appears, and although the players are not told this, there is a false bottom within the box. This means it's possible to trick other players by showing them the fake guess that appears to be top of your box and closing it in front of them, causing the false bottom that hid your actual answer to fall and end up on top.

Episode 4: Fish Shop (10 contestants) 
This game is similar to Fruit Stand, the first game in The Genius: Black Garnet.

The objective of Fish Shop is to earn the most money, done through collaborating with the competition to sell at high prices, or undercutting their trust. The fish sold in Fish Shop were hairtail, mackerel, and squid. Players are given 6 sales tickets to be used freely over the course of 4 rounds. Sales tickets can be traded in for the right to sell a fish (Sales tickets are non-transferrable between players). Before the start of a round, a player must choose how many sales tickets to use, and what fish they wish to sell with those tickets. Once everyone submits their tickets in secret, the players selling each fish will be revealed. Players must then decide on an asking price for their fish, from a minimum of ₩1000 to a maximum of ₩5000, as long as the price is a full dollar increment. After everyone anonymously submits their offers, the selling price of the fish is revealed. Everyone's fish will be sold by the seller offering the lowest price. For example, if 4 people offered to sell a squid at ₩4000, while 1 person offered to sell the squid at ₩1000, the undercutter would sell everyone's squid and earn ₩5000. If multiple players offer the lowest price, they will split the total earnings. Players also have the choice to use either a Secret or a Check item once during the game. The Secret item allows you to hide the selling price of one type of fish for that round. The Check item will let you know your total earnings so far. The player who earns the most after 4 rounds wins, while the player that earns the least becomes the elimination candidate.

Ratings 

As most Korean non-drama cable programs rarely reach 1 percent, these ratings are considered very high.
 In the ratings below, the highest rating for the show will be in red, and the lowest rating for the show will be in blue

External links

The Genius (TV series)
2015 South Korean television seasons
2015 South Korean television series debuts
2015 South Korean television series endings